Elena Gorolová (2 January 1969) is a Czech human rights defender. She works as a social worker in Ostrava and is of Roma origins.

At the age of 21, she was forcibly sterilized in hospital after giving birth to her second son. She had hoped to have another child and had not given her informed consent to the procedure. In the year 2005 Elena was one of the 87 Czech women complaining of being forcibly sterilized.

Since then, she has campaigned against forced sterilization and discrimination against Roma women in Czechia and advocating for redress and awareness of forced sterilizations. She is the spokesperson for the Group of Women Harmed by Forced Sterilization and a member of Czech organization Vzájemné soužití (Life Together).

In November 2018, she was recognized as one of 100 inspiring and influential women from around the world for 2018 published by the BBC.

References

1969 births
Living people
Czech Romani people
Czech human rights activists
Women human rights activists
Reproductive rights activists
BBC 100 Women